Al-Ittihad won the 1996–97 Saudi Premier League, their second championship, the last being won in 1982.

Stadia and locations

Final league table

Promoted: Al-Sho'ala and Al-Ta'awan.

Playoffs

Semifinals

Third place match

Final

External links 
 RSSSF Stats
 Saudi Arabia Football Federation
 Saudi League Statistics

Saudi Premier League seasons
Saudi Professional League
Professional League